Ashleigh Barty and Storm Sanders defeated Darija Jurak Schreiber and Andreja Klepač in the final, 6–1, 6–4, to win the women's doubles title at the 2022 Adelaide International 1. For Barty, the victory marked the third occasion in her career where she won both the singles and doubles titles at the same tournament.

Alexa Guarachi and Desirae Krawczyk were the defending champions, but chose not to participate.

Seeds

Draw

Draw

References

External links
 Main draw in WTA website Tournaments Draws on WTA website]
Main draw scores

Adelaide International 1 - Women's Doubles
2022
Adelaide